Kyra Minturn Sedgwick (born August 19, 1965) is an American actress, producer and director. For her starring role as Deputy Chief Brenda Leigh Johnson on the TNT crime drama The Closer, she won a Golden Globe Award in 2007 and an Emmy Award in 2010. She also had a recurring role as Madeline Wuntch on the sitcom Brooklyn Nine-Nine.

Sedgwick was nominated for a Golden Globe award for her performance in Something to Talk About (1995). Her other film roles include Oliver Stone's Born on the Fourth of July (1989), Cameron Crowe's Singles (1992), Heart and Souls (1993), Phenomenon (1996), What's Cooking (2000), Secondhand Lions (2003), The Game Plan (2007), The Possession (2012), and The Edge of Seventeen (2016).

Early life
Sedgwick was born in New York City, the daughter of Patricia (née Rosenwald), a speech teacher and educational/family therapist and Henry Dwight Sedgwick V, a venture capitalist. Her mother was Jewish and her father was Episcopalian and of English heritage. Sedgwick has identified herself as Jewish and has stated that she participates in Passover seders.

A member of the Sedgwick family on her father's side, she is a descendant of Major General Robert Sedgwick, Judge Theodore Sedgwick, Endicott Peabody (the founder of the Groton School), William Ellery (a signer of the Declaration of Independence), Samuel Appleton, John Lathrop, of Boston, Massachusetts, and is the great-granddaughter of Henry Dwight Sedgwick III, thus the corresponding niece to his brother Ellery Sedgwick, owner/editor (1908-1938) of The Atlantic Monthly. Sedgwick is also a sister of actor Robert Sedgwick, half-sister of jazz guitarist Mike Stern, the first cousin once removed of actress Edie Sedgwick, and a niece of the writer John Sedgwick. She is the aunt of R&B/pop singer George Nozuka and his younger singer-songwriter brother Justin Nozuka (their mother, Holly, is Sedgwick's half-sister).

Sedgwick's parents separated when she was four and divorced when she was six; her mother subsequently married Ben Heller, an art dealer.

Sedgwick graduated from Friends Seminary and attended Sarah Lawrence College before transferring to the University of Southern California, where she graduated with a theater degree.

Career

Sedgwick made her debut at the age of 16 on the television soap opera Another World as Julia Shearer, troubled granddaughter of Liz Matthews. In 1988, she appeared in a TV version of Lanford Wilson's Lemon Sky. In 1989 she played Donna opposite Tom Cruise's Ron Kovic in Oscar-winning  Born on the Fourth of July. During the 1990s, she appeared in several Hollywood movies, including Singles (1992), Heart and Souls (1993), Something to Talk About (1995), and Phenomenon, in which she played the love interest of John Travolta's character. She acted in Critical Care (1997). She starred in the Emmy Award–winning 1992 made-for-TV film Miss Rose White as a Jewish immigrant who comes to terms with her ethnicity. She played the parts of Mae Coleman in 2003's Secondhand Lions and Stella Peck in the 2007 film The Game Plan. She also starred alongside her husband Kevin Bacon in two films: the 1991 sex comedy Pyrates, and the 2004 drama The Woodsman. She dubbed the voice of Batwoman in the animated movie Batman: Mystery of the Batwoman.

Sedgwick starred in the television series The Closer from 2005 to 2012. In 2007, she began earning roughly $300,000 per episode. Over the life of the series, she was nominated for and won several awards for her starring role as Deputy Chief Brenda Leigh Johnson. She received a Golden Globe award in 2007 for her performance as lead actress and won a Primetime Emmy Award in 2010. In 2009, Sedgwick was awarded a star on the Hollywood Walk of Fame for Television.

The Closer ended on August 13, 2012, following the completion of its seventh season; the series's broadcaster, TNT, said that the decision to retire the series was made by Sedgwick. A sequel series starring most of the same cast called Major Crimes continued in its place.

Sedgwick produced the television series  Proof for TNT which debuted in 2015 for one season. 
She is also featured in the NBC comedy series Brooklyn Nine-Nine portraying the character of Madeline Wuntch.

Sedgwick will play the lead role of Jean Raines in the ABC comedy pilot My Village, written by Kari Lizer.  The series was green-lighted by ABC and re-titled Call Your Mother on May 21, 2020, for the 2020–2021 television season.

Personal life
Sedgwick married actor Kevin Bacon on September 4, 1988. The couple have two children, Travis Sedgwick Bacon and actress Sosie Ruth Bacon. The family lives in New York City.

Awards and nominations

Honors 
 2005: Received the Copper Wing Tribute Award presented to her during the Phoenix Film Festival.
 2009, June 8: Inducted into the Hollywood Walk of Fame receiving a star for her contribution to Television located at 6356 Hollywood, Blvd. – the 2,384th star, presented to her by the President and CEO of the Hollywood Chamber of Commerce, Leron Gubler.
 2013: Honored with the President's Award by the Society of Camera Operators.
 2017: Received the John Cassavetes Award presented to her during the Denver International Film Festival.

Accolades

References

External links

 
 
 
 Kyra Sedgwick at Hollywood Walk of Fame
 Kyra Sedgwick at Internet Broadway Database
 

1965 births
20th-century American actresses
21st-century American actresses
Actresses from New York City
American film actresses
American people of English descent
American television actresses
American voice actresses
Best Drama Actress Golden Globe (television) winners
Cornell family
Jewish American actresses
Living people
Peabody family
People from the Upper West Side
Outstanding Performance by a Lead Actress in a Drama Series Primetime Emmy Award winners
Sarah Lawrence College alumni
Sedgwick family
USC School of Dramatic Arts alumni
Friends Seminary alumni